Saša Nikitović (born 12 June 1979), is a Serbian professional basketball coach and former player. He is currently the head coach for Dynamic VIP PAY of the Basketball League of Serbia.

Playing career 
Nikitović played for Crvena zvezda, Radnički Obrenovac, Umka, Doboj (Bosnia and Herzegovina) and CSU Sibiu of the Romanian League.

Coaching career 
In 2004, Nikitović began his coaching career with Partizan in Belgrade as assistant coach of Duško Vujošević. Later he moved to Crvena zvezda where he worked as assistant coach with Dragan Šakota and Stevan Karadžić.

On 18 March 2011, Nikitović was named the head coach of Crvena zvezda of the Adriatic League and the Basketball League of Serbia, after the coach Mihailo Uvalin got fired.

On 19 November 2018, Nikitović was named a head coach of the Slovenian team Petrol Olimpija. On February 19, 2019, Olimpija parted ways with Nikitović after the contract was terminated by a mutual agreement.

In June 2019, was named the under-18 team head coach for Dynamic Belgrade, as well as their youth system coordinator. On 12 February 2021, Dynamic Belgrade hired Nikitović as their new first team head coach.

National teams 
Nikitović was an assistant coach of Dušan Ivković in the national team of Serbia at two FIBA EuroBaskets, 2009 in Poland and 2011 in Lithuania, and at the 2010 FIBA World Championship in Turkey. He won silver medal at EuroBasket 2009.

He was an assistant coach of Aleksandar Kesar in the university team of Serbia at two Summer Universiades, 2007 in Bangkok and 2009 in Belgrade. He won a gold medal at 2009 Universiade and a silver medal at 2007 Universiade.

Nikitović led the Serbia national under-16 team at the 2010 European U16 Championship in Montenegro and at the 2011 European U16 Championship in Czech Republic.

He led the Bahrain national team at the 2013 FIBA Asia Championship in Philippines.

See also 
 List of KK Crvena zvezda head coaches

Notes

References

External links 
 Profile at aba-liga.com

1979 births
Living people
Basketball players from Belgrade
Guards (basketball)
KK Crvena zvezda head coaches
KK Crvena zvezda assistant coaches
KK Crvena zvezda youth players
KK Dynamic coaches
KK Olimpija coaches
KK Radnički Obrenovac players
Serbian men's basketball coaches
Serbian men's basketball players
Serbian expatriate basketball people in Bahrain
Serbian expatriate basketball people in Bosnia and Herzegovina
Serbian expatriate basketball people in Slovenia
Serbian expatriate basketball people in Romania